Turkey competed at the 2014 Summer Youth Olympics, in Nanjing, China from 16 August to 28 August 2014.

Medal summary

Medal table

Medalists

Archery

Turkey qualified two archers based on its performance at the 2013 World Archery Youth Championships.

Individual

Team

Athletics

Turkey qualified nine athletes.

Qualification Legend: Q=Final A (medal); qB=Final B (non-medal); qC=Final C (non-medal); qD=Final D (non-medal); qE=Final E (non-medal)

Boys
Track & road events

Field Events

Girls
Field events

Badminton

Turkey qualified two athletes based on the 2 May 2014 BWF Junior World Rankings.

Singles

Doubles

Beach volleyball

Turkey qualified a girls' team from their performance at the 2014 CEV Youth Continental Cup Final.

Boxing

Turkey qualified five boxers based on its performance at the 2014 AIBA Youth World Championships.

Boys

Girls

Fencing

Turkey qualified one athlete based on its performance at the 2014 FIE Cadet World Championships.

Girls

Mixed Team

Gymnastics

Artistic Gymnastics

Turkey qualified one athlete based on its performance at the 2014 European WAG Championships.

Girls

Judo

Turkey qualified two athletes based on its performance at the 2013 Cadet World Judo Championships.

Individual

Team

Modern Pentathlon

Turkey qualified one athlete based on its performance at the 2014 Youth A World Championships.

Rowing

Turkey qualified one boat based on its performance at the 2013 World Rowing Junior Championships.

Qualification Legend: FA=Final A (medal); FB=Final B (non-medal); FC=Final C (non-medal); FD=Final D (non-medal); SA/B=Semifinals A/B; SC/D=Semifinals C/D; R=Repechage

Sailing

Turkey was given a reallocation boat based on being a top ranked nation not yet qualified.

Shooting

Turkey qualified one shooter based on its performance at the 2014 European Shooting Championships.

Individual

Team

Swimming

Turkey qualified four swimmers.

Boys

Girls

Taekwondo

Turkey qualified three athletes based on its performance at the Taekwondo Qualification Tournament.

Boys

Girls

Weightlifting

Turkey qualified 1 quota in the boys' and girls' events based on the team ranking after the 2014 Weightlifting Youth European Championships.

Boys

Girls

Wrestling

Turkey qualified three athletes based on its performance at the 2014 European Cadet Championships.

Boys

Girls

References

External links
Turkey at the 2014 Summer Olympics at Turkey National Olympic Committee website

2014 in Turkish sport
Nations at the 2014 Summer Youth Olympics
Summer 2014